Manaka Ranaka (born 6 April 1979), is a South African actress known for playing her starring role for long standing soap opera  Generations: The Legacy . In 2000, she played the role of Nandipha Sithole on Isidingo soap opera aired on SABC 3.

In 2007, She won the South African Film and Television Award (SAFTA) for Best Actress in a Television Comedy.

Early life
Manaka was born on April 6, 1979 in Soweto. She attended Dinwiddie high school.

Personal life
She is the mother of 3 children , Katlego, Naledi and a new baby.

Filmography

Television

References

External links

1979 births
Living people
South African actresses
People from Soweto